In April 2019 in Sheremetyevo International Airport, Russian authorities arrested Israeli-American Naama Issachar, a transit passenger flying from India to Israel, for alleged drug smuggling after some 10 grams of marijuana or hashish were found in her bag during a stopover in Moscow. On 11 October 2019 a Russian court sentenced her to seven and a half years in prison on drug possession and smuggling charges.
Issachar's family and Israeli officials said that Russia told them she would be released if Aleksey Burkov, a Russian national pending extradition from Israel to the United States on suspicion of committing cyber crimes, was released to Russia. Israeli Prime Minister Benjamin Netanyahu subsequently personally requested from Russian President Vladimir Putin a pardon for Issachar, which Putin said he would consider. Israel's High Court ultimately rejected Burkov's appeal against his extradition, leading Russia to condemn the decision as "a breach ... of Israel's international obligations", stating that the decision "does not contribute to the development of [Russian-Israeli] relations".

On 19 October 2019 rallies were held in Tel Aviv and in New York City calling for Issachar's release. Billboards were put up in Israel calling on Putin to "please bring Naama home."

In December 2019, the Israeli Justice Ministry transferred the historical  in Jerusalem to the Putin-allied Imperial Orthodox Palestine Society from the competing Imperial Orthodox Palestine Historic Society, which many commentators linked to negotiating Issachar's release.
On 29 January 2020 President Putin signed her pardon. Her attorney previously noted that no convicted foreigner was ever pardoned by a Russian President before.

See also
 Israel–Russia relations
 Ilan Grapel affair
 Brittney Griner - an American citizen detained in Russia on similar charges

Further reading

References

External links

The official site of the headquarter for Naama's liberation (English, Hebrew, Russian)

Israel–Russia relations
2019 in Israel
2019 in Russia
2020 in Israel
2020 in Russia
2020 crimes in Russia